Mark Joseph Hurley  (December 13, 1919 – February 5, 2001) was an American prelate of the Roman Catholic Church. He served as Bishop of Santa Rosa in California from 1969 to 1986.

Early life and education
Mark Hurley was born in San Francisco, California, one of five children of Mark Joseph and Josephine (née Keohane) Hurley. One of his brothers, Francis Thomas Hurley, served as Bishop of Juneau (1971–1976) and Archbishop of Anchorage (1976–2001). He received his early education at the parochial school of St. Agnes Church in his native city. He began his studies for the priesthood at St. Joseph's College in Mountain View, graduating in 1939. He then completed his theological studies at St. Patrick's Seminary in Menlo Park.

Priesthood
Hurley was ordained a priest for the Archdiocese of San Francisco on September 23, 1944. He served as assistant superintendent of archdiocesan schools from 1944 to 1951. In addition to his duties, he studied at the University of California for one year, and earned a doctorate in philosophy from the Catholic University of America in Washington, D.C. in 1947. He served as the founding principal of Bishop O'Dowd High School in Oakland from 1951 to 1958, afterwards holding the same position at Marin Catholic High School in Kentfield (1959–61). He was also assistant coordinator of the Archdiocesan Campaign of Taxation of Schools in California.

In 1962, Hurley was named a domestic prelate by Pope John XXIII and superintendent of schools in the Diocese of Stockton. He earned a Bachelor's degree in canon law from the Pontifical Lateran University in Rome in 1963. From 1962 to 1965, he was a peritus, or theological expert, at the Second Vatican Council in Rome, where he served as an advisor to the commission on seminaries, universities, and schools. He also served as chancellor of the Diocese of Stockton during the same period. Following his return to the Archdiocese of San Francisco, he served as assistant chancellor from 1965 to 1969. For several years, he was on a San Francisco television program, "Problems Please."

Principal Assignments

Asst. Supt. of Schools, Archdiocese of San Francisco, 1944–1951

Teacher, Serra High School, San Mateo, CA 1944

Principal, Bishop O'Dowd High School, Oakland, CA, 1951–1958

Supt. of Schools, Diocese of Stockton, 1962–1965

Professor in graduate schools: Loyola University, Baltimore; University of San Francisco; San Francis(co?) College for Women; Dominican College; Catholic University of America.

Delegate, Conference on Psychiatry and Religion, San Francisco, 1957

Member of the Board, State of California Committee for the Study of Education, 1955–1960

Delegate-at-Large, state of California, White House Conference on Youth, Washington, DC, 1960

Catholic delegate and observer, National Council of Churches (Protestant), Columbus, OH, 1964

Delegate to NCEA Education Conference of German and American Educators, Munich, Germany, 1960

Member of Commission on Seminaries, Universities, and Schools, Second Vatican Council, 1962–63, 1964–65, peritus to the Council, 1962–1965

Member of NCEA delegation for study of education in Peru, 1965

Member, Liaison Committee of National Conference of Catholic Bishops (USA) with Priests' Senates

Member Commission on Christian Formation, United States Catholic Conference of Bishops, 1968

Member, Education, Committee of the Bishops of California, 1969

Other Assignments

Asst. archdiocesan coordinator of the Campaign on Taxation of Schools in California, 1958

Asst. archdiocesan coordinator, Rosary Crusade, 1948–1951

Administrator, St. Eugene Church, Santa Rosa, CA, 1959

Chancellor, Diocese of Stockton, Californian diocesan consultor, 1962–1965

Syndicated columnist, San Francisco, The Monitor, Sacramento Herald, Oakland Voice, Yakima Our Times, Guam Diocesan Press, 1949–1966

"Faith of Our Father" weekly TV program speaker, 1956–1958, San Francisco

"Problems Please," weekly TV program panelist, 1961–1967

Member of US bishops' press panel, Vatican Council, Rome, 1964–65

Member of the US bishops' Committee on the Laity, Rome, 1964

Member of the US bishops' Committee on the Laity, Rome, Jewish Relations, 1964 through at least January 1970

Asst. chancellor, Archdiocese of San Francisco, 1965

Pastor, St. Francis of Assisi Church, San Francisco, Nov. 7, 1967 through his installation as Bishop of Santa Rosa

Vicar general, Archdiocese of San Francisco, January 18, 1968 through his installation as Bishop of Santa Rosa

Chairman, Citizens' Committee for San Francisco State College, December 12, 1968.

Publications

Church State Relationships in Education in California, 1948, Washington, DC

Commentary on Declaration on Christian Education of Vatican II, 1966, Paulist Press, Glenn Rock, NJ

Report on Education in Peru, NCEA, Washington, DC, 1965

Informe Sobre La Educacion en Peru, Asoceacion Catholica de Educacion National, Washington, DC, 1965

Course of Studies for Elementary Schools, Social Studies, 1949, San Francisco

Articles for periodicals such as America, Catholic Education Review, Catholic School Journal, Hi Time, The Way Information, Maryknoll Magazine

Knight Commander of the Order of the Holy Sepulchre, June 1969

Episcopacy

San Francisco
On November 21, 1967, Hurley was appointed auxiliary bishop of San Francisco and titular bishop of Thunusuda by Pope Paul VI. He received his episcopal consecration on January 4, 1968, from Archbishop Joseph Thomas McGucken, with Bishops Hugh Aloysius Donohoe and Ernest John Primeau serving as co-consecrators. His consecration was one of the first such liturgies to be celebrated in the vernacular. As an auxiliary bishop, he continued to serve as assistant chancellor of the archdiocese.

Santa Rosa
Following the transfer of Bishop Leo Thomas Maher to the Diocese of San Diego, Hurley was named the second Bishop of Santa Rosa on November 19, 1969. His installation took place at St. Eugene Cathedral on January 14, 1970. During his tenure, he implemented the reforms of the Second Vatican Council and worked to ensure the financial stability of the diocese.

He established terms of office for pastors and associate pastors, opened a low-income senior residence, and created the Priests' Retirement Fund, Project Hope, and the Apostolic Endowment Fund. He founded the Centro Pastoral Hispano and re-dedicated Blessed Kateri Tekakwitha Mission. He established two new parishes in his last five years as bishop, and ordained over a dozen priests and deacons in his last three years.

Later life and death
After governing the diocese for sixteen years, Hurley resigned as Bishop of Santa Rosa on April 15, 1986. He later died after an operation for an aneurysm in San Francisco, at age 81.

References

1919 births
2001 deaths
People from San Francisco
Roman Catholic Archdiocese of San Francisco
Roman Catholic bishops of Santa Rosa in California
20th-century Roman Catholic bishops in the United States
Saint Patrick's Seminary and University alumni
University of California, Berkeley alumni
Catholic University of America alumni
Knights of the Holy Sepulchre